Katie McNeil Diamond is an American talent manager and long-form music video and concert documentary producer.

Early life and education
McNeil was born and raised in Smithtown, New York.  She was a horseback rider as a child, and rode competitively throughout high school.  She attended University at Albany, SUNY, graduating in 1993 with a degree in communication.

Career
McNeil began her career as an intern at MTV and  later served as executive producer of television and home video at House of Blues Entertainment. In 2003 she accepted a job at 10th Street Entertainment and transitioned to artist management. As an artist manager and the head of media at 10th Street, she worked with artists including Motley Crue, Blondie, Hanson and Buckcherry.  In 2007 she starred as herself -- a "ball busting exec" -- on the VH1 reality show, ''Mission: Man Band.

McNeil was hired as a manager at Azoff Entertainment in 2007.  In addition to working with Guns N' Roses, 30 Seconds to Mars, and other artists, she co-managed Neil Diamond with Irving Azoff.  She lobbied Azoff to work with Diamond, stating in a 2012 interview that professionally, managing Diamond would be a "feather in her cap."  Diamond and McNeil began dating in 2009, and in 2011 Diamond announced via Twitter that he and McNeil were engaged. They were married in 2012. Although she resigned from her position at Azoff Entertainment she  continued to manage Diamond.

Personal life
McNeil and Diamond live primarily in Beverly Hills, California and New York City. She is active in animal rescue and is an avid equestrian. An amateur wildlife photographer, she frequently shares her photos on Twitter.

Selected videography

References

External links

1970 births
Living people
People from Smithtown, New York
American music managers
University at Albany, SUNY alumni